Greyhounds (Portuguese: Os Galgos) is a painting by Amadeo de Souza Cardoso, from 1911.

Description 
The painting is an oil on canvas with overall dimensions  of 100 x 73 centimeters. It is in the collection of the Modern Art Center José de Azeredo Perdigão, in Lisbon.

Analysis 
The scene shows two greyhounds and a hare against a flat background.

Sources

References 

1911 paintings
Portuguese art
Dogs in art